10N may refer to:

 Nitrogen-10 (10N), an isotope of nitrogen
 List of highways numbered 10N, various highways
Powers of 10, or 10 multiplied by itself n times, sometimes written as 10n

See also
 N10 (disambiguation)